Pablo Urtasun Pérez (born 29 March 1980) is a Spanish former professional road bicycle racer, who rode professionally between 2005 and 2016. He now works as a directeur sportif for UCI Continental team .

Career
Urtasun was born in Urdiain, Navarre. In 2013, Urtasun earned his team's first victory of the season by outsprinting his rivals in the first stage of the Vuelta a Castilla y León.

Urtasun joined the PinoRoad squad for the 2014 season, after his previous team –  – folded at the end of the 2013 season. For the 2015 season, he joined the Japanese UCI Continental team .

After retiring, Urtasun became a directeur sportif for UCI Continental team  in 2020, during their first season of competition.

Major results

2004
 1st Stage 3 Vuelta a Navarra
2006
 1st Stage 1 Volta ao Alentejo
 2nd Overall Rheinland-Pfalz Rundfahrt
2007
 1st Stage 3 Vuelta a La Rioja
2008
 1st Stage 5 Vuelta a Asturias
 5th Gran Premio de Llodio
2009
 3rd Prueba Villafranca de Ordizia
2010
 1st Stage 1 Vuelta a Asturias
2012
 1st Stage 7 Tour of Britain
 2nd Vuelta a La Rioja
 3rd Overall Vuelta a Castilla y León
2013 
 2nd Klasika Primavera
 4th Overall Vuelta a Castilla y León
1st Stage 1
  Combativity award Stage 6 Vuelta a España

Grand Tour general classification results timeline

References

External links 

Profile on team site

1980 births
Living people
Spanish male cyclists
People from Barranca (comarca)
Cyclists from Navarre
Directeur sportifs